Catocala naumanni is a moth in the family Erebidae first described by Andreĭ Valentinovich Sviridov in 1996. It is found in China.

References

naumanni
Moths described in 1996
Moths of Asia